Miss Universe Vietnam 2015 was the 2nd edition of the Miss Universe Vietnam pageant. After a 7-year hiatus, Miss Universe Vietnam returned in 2015. The grand finale was held on October 3, 2015 at Crown Convention Center, Nha Trang, the exact venue for Miss Universe 2008. Miss Universe Vietnam 2008 Nguyễn Thùy Lâm crowned her successor Phạm Thị Hương at the end of the event.

Phạm Thị Hương represented Vietnam at the Miss Universe 2015 competition in Las Vegas, United States. As the second runner-up, Đặng Thị Lệ Hằng was appointed as Miss Universe Vietnam 2016 to represent Vietnam at Miss Universe 2016. It was also considered as a beauty pageant edition which had the most successful delegates ever in the Top 15, many of whom represented Vietnam at the biggest international pageants: Nguyễn Thị Loan was chosen to be the country's representative at Miss Universe 2017 are 3rd runner up, she had represented Vietnam at Miss World 2014 (as Top 5 Miss Vietnam 2010) and Miss Grand International 2016 as 2nd Runner-up of Miss Ethnic Vietnam 2013; Nguyễn Thị Lệ Nam Em was the presentative at Miss Earth 2016 as Miss Mekong Delta 2015; Trương Thị Diệu Ngọc at Miss World 2016 as Miss Aodai Vietnam 2016; Đỗ Mỹ Linh at Miss World 2017 as Miss Vietnam 2016; Đỗ Trần Khánh Ngân crowned Miss Globe 2017 as Miss Tourism Vietnam 2017; Nguyễn Trần Khánh Vân at Miss Universe 2020 as Miss Universe Vietnam 2019 and the final one is Đặng Dương Thanh Thanh Huyền, the representative of Vietnam at Miss Charm 2023.

Results

Placements
Color keys

Special Awards

Order of announcement

Top 15
Lê Thị Sang
Phạm Thị Ngọc Quý
Phạm Thị Hương
Ngô Thị Trúc Linh
Nguyễn Trần Khánh Vân
Đặng Dương Thanh Thanh Huyền
Đỗ Trần Khánh Ngân
Đỗ Mỹ Linh
Nguyễn Thị Lệ Nam Em
Đặng Thị Lệ Hằng
Ngô Trà My
Trương Thị Diệu Ngọc
Nguyễn Thị Loan
Chế Nguyễn Quỳnh Châu
Trần Thị Kim Chi

Top 10
Phạm Thị Ngọc Quý
Ngô Thị Trúc Linh
Trương Thị Diệu Ngọc
Nguyễn Thị Loan
Nguyễn Trần Khánh Vân
Nguyễn Thị Lệ Nam Em
Đặng Thị Lệ Hằng
Ngô Trà My
Phạm Thị Hương
Trần Thị Kim Chi

Top 5
Nguyễn Thị Loan
Đặng Thị Lệ Hằng
Phạm Thị Hương
Ngô Trà My
Ngô Thị Trúc Linh

Top 3
Ngô Trà My
Đặng Thị Lệ Hằng
Phạm Thị Hương

Contestants

Top 45 final round

* Candidate withdrawals before the coronation night because of health problem.

Top 70 preliminary

References

Beauty pageants in Vietnam
2015 beauty pageants
Vietnamese awards